Hyporhamphus yuri is a halfbeak from the family Hemiramphidae which has been reported from Okinawa and nearby islands in the north-west Pacific Ocean. This species was described by Bruce Baden Collette & Nikolai Vasilyevich Parin in 1978 from a type obtained at the Naha Market in Okinawa. The specific name honours the Russian ichthyologist Yuri Nikolayevich Shcherbachev of the Institute of Oceanology, Academy of Sciences of the USSR.

References

yuri